This is an incomplete list of settlements with significant (plurality or majority) ethnic Roma population.

Europe

Central and Eastern Europe
Bosnia and Herzegovina

Bulgaria
There are many Roma neighborhoods in Bulgarian cities, such as Plovdiv.

Czech Republic

Hungary

Kosovo

North Macedonia

Moldova

Montenegro

Romania

Russia

Serbia

Slovakia

Slovenia

Southern Europe

Spain

Portugal

Italy

Greece

Turkey

European and Asian part

Turkey

See also 
 Romani people by country
 Romani people in Eastern Europe
 Romanistan

References